A New Lease of Death is a novel by British writer Ruth Rendell, first published in 1967. It is the second entry in her popular Inspector Wexford series. The novel was titled Sins of the Fathers in the USA.

References

1967 British novels
Novels by Ruth Rendell
Inspector Wexford series
John Long Ltd books